Abdabad (also Romanized as ‘Abdābād) is a village in Zavarom Rural District, in the Central District of Shirvan County, North Khorasan Province, Iran. At the 2006 census, its population was 907, in 213 families.

References 

Populated places in Shirvan County